Jesse Harrison Jefferson (March 3, 1949 – September 8, 2011) was an American professional baseball pitcher with the Baltimore Orioles (1973-1975), Chicago White Sox (1975-1976), Toronto Blue Jays (1977-1980), Pittsburgh Pirates (1980) and California Angels (1981) of Major League Baseball (MLB). Jefferson batted left-handed and threw right-handed.

Career

Baltimore Orioles
Jefferson was drafted by the Baltimore Orioles in the 1968 Major League Baseball draft out of Carver High School in Midlothian, Virginia. He pitched a ten-inning complete game in his major league debut on June 23. In the second game of a doubleheader with the Boston Red Sox at Fenway Park, he nearly pitched a five-hit shutout; Rico Petrocelli hit a solo home run to tie the score with two outs in the ninth inning. The Orioles responded with a run in the top of the tenth inning to earn Jefferson the win.

Jefferson's rookie season was his only winning season, as he went 6–5 with a 4.11 ERA as a spot starter and middle inning relief pitcher. The Orioles captured the American League East crown, and manager Earl Weaver had Jefferson slated to be his long reliever in the post season, but he did not make an appearance in the 1973 American League Championship Series with the Oakland Athletics.

Chicago White Sox
After going 0–2 in four games during the first  months of the campaign, Jefferson was traded from the Orioles to the White Sox for Tony Muser in one of two transactions made by Chicago at the non-waiver trade deadline on June 15, . With the Chisox, Jefferson was moved back into the starting rotation, compiling a 5–9 record with a 5.10 ERA.

Toronto Blue Jays
His 33 starts and 217 innings pitched were by far his best. Despite setting a Blue Jay franchise record with nine walks in a game against Baltimore on June 18, Jefferson's strikeout-to-walk ratio was also a career best 1.37 as he struck out 114 batters versus 83 walks.

Perhaps the most memorable outing of Jefferson's career came on May 16,  against eventual 22–game winner Mike Norris and the Oakland A's. Jefferson held the A's to just four hits over 11 innings while striking out ten. Norris was equally brilliant, but the Jays managed to squeak out a run in the bottom of the 11th to earn Jefferson the win.

After that performance, Jefferson lost his next five decisions. He made his final appearance for Toronto on September 1, facing five batters and retiring just one while giving up three earned runs, allowing an inherited runner to score and committing an error. He was placed on waivers with a 4–13 record and 5.47 ERA.

He was selected off waivers by the Pittsburgh Pirates on September 11, and made just one appearance for the club, beating the Chicago Cubs.

Following the season, he signed as a free agent with the California Angels. He started the  season in the Angels' starting rotation, but after going 0–4 with a 4.68 ERA in his first five starts, was moved into the bullpen. He pitched far better in relief, going 2–0 with a 1.04 ERA in 21 appearances. He spent Spring training  with the Orioles, but did not make the club.

Death
In 2011, Jefferson died of prostate cancer.

References

External links
, or Jesse Jefferson - Baseballbiography.com, or Retrosheet

1949 births
2011 deaths
African-American baseball players
American expatriate baseball players in Canada
American expatriate baseball players in Mexico
Asheville Orioles players
Baltimore Orioles players
Baseball players from Virginia
Bravos de León players
California Angels players
Deaths from cancer in Virginia
Chicago White Sox players
Dallas–Fort Worth Spurs players
Deaths from prostate cancer
Edmonton Trappers players
Florida Instructional League Orioles players
Major League Baseball pitchers
Mexican League baseball pitchers
Miami Marlins (FSL) players
People from Midlothian, Virginia
Pittsburgh Pirates players
Rochester Red Wings players
Stockton Ports players
Tecolotes de Nuevo Laredo players
Tigres de Aragua players
American expatriate baseball players in Venezuela
Tomateros de Culiacán players
Toronto Blue Jays players
20th-century African-American sportspeople
21st-century African-American people